Mehbooba is a 1976 Indian Hindi-language romantic drama film produced by Mushir-Riaz and directed by Shakti Samanta. The film stars Rajesh Khanna, Hema Malini and Prem Chopra. The story is based on the reincarnation theme. The music is composed by Rahul Dev Burman. The film is noted for an impressive performance by the lead pair and for its haunting melodies such as the solo song "Mere Naina Sawan Bhadon", sung by both Kishore Kumar and Lata Mangeshkar, "Chalo Ri" by Lata and the duet song "Parbat Ke Peeche". The plot is based on Gulshan Nanda's novel Sisakate Saaz, and Nanda also wrote the screenplay himself. Upon its release, the movie was a silver jubilee in many territories and did not do well in Mumbai. This film has gained a cult following over the years.

Plot

Singer Suraj (Rajesh Khanna) was presented with a tanpura by his fiancée's father. Thereafter, he often listens to a haunting song at nights and observes that its name was "Ratna". One day, while going for a stage show, he gets stuck in heavy rain in an unknown place and goes to stay in a small motel, where he meets a woman named Ratna. During the night, he observes that Ratna, singing the same song he often hears at night, is going to a distant palace. He follows her instinctively and enters the abandoned palace. He tries to call out for Ratna, but learns from the old keeper of the palace that Ratna died more than a hundred years ago and people feel that she still haunts that place.

Later, a portrait of Ratna makes him remember their previous life. In the previous life he was Prakash, chief singer of royal court. He was in love with Ratna, a beautiful and talented court dancer. They fell in love, but failed to consummate their relationship as Prakash was already promised to Jamuna in his childhood and Ratna was to become a royal courtesan, At last, they decided to run away, but were killed on their way, promising each other that they would meet again.

Suraj, after coming to his senses, feels lonely and confused. Shortly thereafter, he meets a gypsy, Jhumri (also Malini), who is Ratna's reincarnation. Soon he makes Jhumri remember her past life and her love for Prakash. This angers Rita Malhotra (Asha Sachdev), Suraj's fiancée and Popatlal (Prem Chopra), who wants to marry Jhumri. Popatlal steals the portrait, and sets the gypsies against Suraj, ensuring a fight between Suraj and gypsies. But Suraj and Jhumri manage to overcome all the obstacles and consummate their relationship this time despite all odds.

Cast

Crew
Director: Shakti Samanta
Story: Gulshan Nanda
Screenplay: Gulshan Nanda
Dialogue: Akhtar Romani
Producer: Mushir Alam, Mohammad Riaz
Production Company: M. R. Productions
Cinematographer: Aloke Dasgupta
Editor: Bijoy Chowdhary
Art Director: Shanti Dass
Stunts: M. B. Shetty
Costume and Wardrobe: Bhanu Athaiya, Jaya Chakravarthy, Dattaram, Shalini Shah, Shriman
Choreographer: Suresh Bhatt, Gopi Krishna
Music Director: Rahul Dev Burman
Lyricist: Anand Bakshi
Playback Singers: Kishore Kumar, Lata Mangeshkar, Manna Dey

Awards 

 24th Filmfare Awards:

Nominated

 Best Actress – Hema Malini
 Best Supporting Actor – Prem Chopra
 Best Music Director – R. D. Burman
 Best Lyricist – Anand Bakshi for "Mere Naina Sawan Bhadon"
 Best Story – Gulshan Nanda

Soundtrack
The music was composed by R. D. Burman. The songs "Mere Naina Sawan Bhadon", "Mehbooba" (title track) and "Parbat Ke Peechhe" too, were popular numbers.

External links

References

Films scored by R. D. Burman
1976 films
1970s Hindi-language films
Films directed by Shakti Samanta
Films about reincarnation
Films based on Indian novels